Emma DeSouza is an Irish writer, political commentator, journalist and campaigner. She has contributed to HuffPost UK, the Business Post, The Guardian, Euronews, TheJournal.ie, the Irish Examiner, The Irish Times and The Irish News.

Family reunion law case
DeSouza took forward a lengthy court challenge against the British Home Secretary over her right under the terms of the Good Friday Agreement to be accepted as an Irish citizen for the purposes of European Union family reunion rights with her American husband, Jake. De Souza was born in Magherafelt, County Londonderry and thus legally a British citizen. In British law as it stood, this meant that her husband was subject to conditions for "indefinite leave to remain" that did not apply to Irish citizens resident in the United Kingdom. DeSouza argued that she had always identified as an Irish citizen (as is her right under the Agreement) and had only ever held an Irish passport (and never a British one). The Home Office declared that she must either reapply as a British citizen or renounce her British citizenship and pay a fee to apply as an Irish citizen. A "First Tier" immigration tribunal found in her favour but the "Upper Tribunal" overturned that decision when the Home Office appealed. Nevertheless, the Home Office granted Jake leave to remain, albeit without formally conceding her case and Mrs DeSouza withdrew her court appeal.

The case resulted in substantial changes to domestic UK immigration rules. In May 2020, the British Home Office announced that the people of Northern Ireland would be considered EU citizens for immigration purposes. This result was cited as a significant victory for DeSouza. Following the changes to UK immigration law DeSouza withdrew her pending court appeal stating that the changes "forced through by our case will now allow Jake to remain in the United Kingdom on the basis of my Irish citizenship and require the Home Office to respect my right under the Good Friday (Belfast) Agreement to be accepted as Irish."

Taoiseach Leo Varadkar singled out DeSouza for praise during an address to an audience in Washington, D.C., which included U.S. House Speaker Nancy Pelosi and Northern Ireland Secretary Brandon Lewis, at the National Building Museum.

Career
DeSouza's other campaign work includes voting rights for Irish citizens abroad and campaigning for full implementation of the Good Friday Agreement. In July 2021, DeSouza was announced as the Chairperson of the All-island Women's Forum, DeSouza said, "The appetite for meaningful structures to provide greater engagement and understanding on this island is evident from the overwhelming interest we have received in the formation of this forum." The Forum operates as a cross-border peacebuilding structure.

DeSouza was one of a number of high-profile people targeted by the columnist Eoghan Harris under his anonymous Twitter account Barbara J. Pym. According to DeSouza, "Much of the abuse was levied at Northern Ireland nationalists, or those deemed nationalists by Harris".

DeSouza ran as an independent candidate in Fermanagh and South Tyrone at the 2022 Northern Ireland Assembly election. She said she believed the election had the potential to significantly disrupt the status quo of Northern politics and that "[k]ey to that change will be independent voices unafraid to join the growing demographic of 'others' not content being shuffled into outdated political movements with partisan ideals". She received 249 votes and was eliminated on the first count.

References 

Writers from Derry (city)
Journalists from Northern Ireland
Year of birth missing (living people)
Living people